Jeta Amata is a Nigerian filmmaker, born on August 21, 1974, to popular Nigerian actor Zack Amata. He comes from a family of veteran filmmakers including Ifoghale Amata, Zack Amata and Fred Amata. Growing up in the film industry, following his family's passion for film, Jeta produced and directed his first film at the age of 21, making it no surprise when he began to rise in the world of film and entertainment.

Education
Amata studied Theater Arts at Benue State University in Makurdi, Nigeria.

Global production and acclaim
His work first went global when he produced a documentary film for the British Broadcasting Corporation (BBC) in 2003, using his film Game of Life as footage for the documentary. He holds 53 nominations and 10 wins for film awards in Africa, Europe and the United States, and is considered one of the most successful filmmakers to come out of West Africa.

Summary of works

Debut film
Debuting his movie Alexa Affair at the 2004 Berlin Film Festival would establish him firmly in the minds of Nigerians, Africans, and the world as a renowned and respected Nigerian filmmaker who tells only stories that impact on people positively.

2006–11
Amata's film The Amazing Grace, which won the Best West African Film Award in the 2006 Screen Nations Awards UK, holds the honor of being the first Nigerian film to be screened at the prestigious Cannes Film Festival. It is the only Nigerian film that has had a western release. It can be found in American stores and on websites such as Netflix.

Soon after, Jeta would be recognized for such movies as Inale and Mary Slessor.

2012-present
Amata's latest film Black November premiered at the United Nations during the General Assembly in 2012 and was also screened at the Kennedy Center as well as the Library of Congress in Washington, D.C. The film inspired the sponsoring of a bi-partisan resolution on the Niger Delta of Nigeria members of the 112th United States Congress, H.CON.RES.121.

Amata had screenings of his documentary Into the Delta, on the situation of the Niger Delta, shown in nine universities in the U.S. including NYU, George Washington University, UCLA and Cornell.

Official appointments
The President of Haiti, Michel Joseph Martelly, made Jeta Amata a Goodwill Ambassador to Haiti.

Colleagues
Amata has worked with Academy Award winner Kim Basinger, Academy Award nominee Mickey Rourke, and music superstars Akon and Wyclef Jean.

Family
In 2001 at an audition in Calabar he met Mbong Amata.  
Two years later, when she was 18, they began dating.   They married in 2008 and their daughter Veno was born later that year. In 2013 they separated and in 2014 they divorced.

Amata is currently in a partnership with Vanessa Teemsma, who has worked in production on his films, including Black November. Together, Amaya and Teemsma welcome the birth of a son in 2019, named Kessiena Donald Amata, the middle name after Teemsma's father.

Filmography

Awards and nominations

 Verona International African Film Festival, Best Film, Black November, 2011
 Verona International African Film Festival, Audience Award, Black November, 2011
 Monaco International Film Festival, Most Entertaining Film, Inale, 2011
 Copenhagen Nollywood Festival, Best Film, Black November, 2011
 American Black Film Festival (ABFF), Best Director (nominated), Black November, 2011
 American Black Film Festival (ABFF), Best Picture (nominated), Black November, 2011
 American Black Film Festival (ABFF), Best Screenplay, Black November, 2011
 Nigerian Entertainment Awards, Best Film, Inale, 2011
 African Academy Movie Awards AAMA, Best Nigerian Film (nominated), Inale, 2011
 NFVSB Awards Nigeria, Best Film, Inale, 2010
 Abuja International Film Festival, Audience Awards, Mary Slessor, 2009
 Abuja International Film Festival, Best Short, Mary Slessor, 2009
 SIMA AWARDS, Best Director, The Amazing Grace, 2008
 Screen Nations Awards, Best West African Film, The Amazing Grace, 2007
 Nigeria Movie Awards NMA, Best Director (nominated), The Amazing Grace, 2007
 Nigeria Movie Awards NMA, Best Picture (nominated), The Amazing Grace, 2007
 Nigeria Movie Awards NMA, Best Cinematography, The Amazing Grace, 2007
 African Academy Movie Awards AAMA, Best Director (nominated), The Amazing Grace, 2006
 African Academy Movie Awards AAMA, Best Cinematography, The Amazing Grace, 2006
 African Academy Movie Awards AAMA, Best Picture (nominated), The Amazing Grace, 2006
 African Academy Movie Awards AAMA, Best Screenplay (nominated), The Amazing Grace, 2006

See also
 List of Nigerian film producers
:Category:Films directed by Jeta Amata

References

External links
 Jeta Amata: Nollywood's Gift to Hollywood from TheGuardian.com
 African Voices: Jeta Amata-Filmmaker

Nigerian film directors
1974 births
Living people
Benue State University alumni
Nigerian male film actors
Nigerian film producers
Nigerian media personalities